Ogilvy v Hope Davies [1976] 1 All ER 683 is an English contract law case concerning promissory estoppel.

Facts
Ogilvy was selling the Creech Hill Farmhouse, Cranborne to Hope Davies. An abstract of title to the house needed to be sent to Hope Davies' solicitors, but Ogilvy, as a trustee failed to include the deed of appointment as trustee until later on. Hope Davies' solicitors delayed making requisitions and completion till the deed was sent, and this put Ogilvy at a loss. Ogilvy sued for losses resulting from the delayed completion.

Judgment
Graham J held that Hope Davies' solicitors should have raised requisitions on the defective abstract of title, because it was defective only in ways which were relatively unimportant and likely to be corrected. The late delivery of the deed of appointment, together with a letter sent by the vendors asking that all the requisitions be raised at the same time, amounted to a waiver by Ogilvy of the time limits on requisitions, and it would be inequitable to allow them to claim for losses occasioned by the delay.

See also

English contract law

Notes

References

English contract case law
High Court of Justice cases
1976 in case law
1976 in British law